The New Zealand national under-23 football team, informally known as the "OlyWhites", represents New Zealand Football and New Zealand in international Under-23 football events, such as the Summer Olympics.

The OlyWhites qualified for the 2008 Summer Olympics in Beijing after winning the OFC Preliminary Competition in Fiji. Thus, Beijing saw the first Olympic appearance for a New Zealand men's football team.

Results and fixtures

Legend

2023

Players

Current squad
The following 22 players were called up for the friendly games against China on 23 and 26 March.
Caps and goals updated as of 2 August 2021 after the game against Japan. 
Head coach: Danny Hay

Overage players in Olympic Games

Previous squads

Competitive record

OFC Men's Olympic Qualifying Tournament
The New Zealand national under-23 football team has competed in the OFC Men's Olympic qualifying tournament since 1991. During the 1980s, the New Zealand national football team participated in Olympic qualification.

Olympic Games

Historical Olympic results

Beijing 2008

London 2012

Tokyo 2020

Historical results

See also
Sport in New Zealand
Football in New Zealand
Women's football in New Zealand
New Zealand national football team
New Zealand national under-20 football team
New Zealand national under-17 football team
New Zealand women's national football team

References

External links
NZ Football Olympic Page
OlyWhites historical results

Oceanian national under-23 association football teams
under-23